A berenhap (Bear's bite in English) or spoetnik (Sputnik in English) is a deep-fried fast food snack from the Netherlands. It consists of a sliced meatball and fried onion rings on a wooden skewer, smothered in peanut sauce. The snack is also served with "Zigeunersaus" (literally translated: Gypsy-sauce),or a cold curry sauce  should one not like peanut sauce. Sometimes, pineapple or bell pepper are used as well as onion rings.

Sources
This article includes text that was translated from the Dutch Wikipedia article Berenhap.

Fast food
Dutch cuisine
Dutch words and phrases